Haßfurt (English: Hassfurt) is a town in Bavaria, Germany, capital of the Haßberge district. It is situated on the river Main, 20 km east of Schweinfurt and 30 km northwest of Bamberg. In 1852, Ludwig's Western Railway reached the town and between 1892 and 1995, which also had a branch line to Hofheim. The 1867 Hassfurt Bridge, thought to be the first Cantilever bridge built, was also there.

Notable residents

Fritz Sauckel (1894-1946), Nazi politician, executed for war crimes
Albert Neuberger FRS, biochemist and professor, was born here in 1908.

References

Haßberge (district)
Shtetls
Populated places on the Main basin
Populated riverside places in Germany